Federal Government Girls College, Ipetumodu is a federal government owned secondary school located in Ipetumodu, Osun State, Nigeria. FGGC Ipetumodu is one of the unity schools established by the federal government since 1995 to cater specifically for the girl child education.

History 
FGGC Ipetumodu was established by the federal government in May 15, 1995 to extend unity secondary schools to Osun State. Previously, 13 unity schools were created in 1974 in other States in Nigeria by the military administration of General Yakubu Gowon. FGGC Ipetumodu replaced Teachers' College Ipetumodu in 1995.

Facilities 
It provides boarding facilities for some of her students. According to information on the official website, the school has a modern academic and sporting facilities including football pitch, school library and science laboratory.

Principals 
 Mrs. M.B. Abolade (May 1995-Feb.2001
 Mrs. E.O. Babaniji (Feb.2001-Mar. 2004
 Mrs. R.A. Jeje (Mar. 2004-Dec.2005
 Mrs. M. U. Renner (Jan.2006-Sept.2008)
 Dr.(Mrs.) O.S. Salam (Sept.2008-July 2014)
 Mrs. M.K. Borha (July.2014-Mar..2018)
 Mrs. Titilope Akinyemi (Mar.2018-Nov.2019)
 Mrs. M.P. Umanah (Nov.2019- to date.

References

External links 
 Official website

Girls' schools in Nigeria
Secondary schools in Osun State
Educational institutions established in 1992
1992 establishments in Nigeria